= Deuveotrechus =

Scientific classification
- Kingdom: Animalia
- Phylum: Arthropoda
- Class: Insecta
- Order: Coleoptera
- Suborder: Adephaga
- Family: Carabidae
- Subfamily: Trechinae
- Genus: Deuveotrechus; Ueno, 1995

Genus of beetles

Deuveotrechus is a genus of beetles in the family Carabidae, containing the following species:

- Deuveotrechus gregoryi Jeannel, 1937
- Deuveotrechus yinae Ueno, 1996
- Deuveotrechus yuae Deuve, 1992
